John A. Grove House, also known as the Henry H. Hunsicker Residence, was a historic home located at Bluffton, Wells County, Indiana.  It was built in 1891, and was a two-story, Queen Anne style frame dwelling.  It featured a conical-roofed turret, steeply pitched hipped roof, and arcaded front porch. The house was destroyed by fire on January 30, 2008.

It was listed on the National Register of Historic Places in 1983 and delisted in 2011.

References

Former National Register of Historic Places in Indiana
Houses on the National Register of Historic Places in Indiana
Queen Anne architecture in Indiana
Houses completed in 1891
Buildings and structures in Wells County, Indiana
National Register of Historic Places in Wells County, Indiana